The West End Museum is a neighborhood museum dedicated to the collection, preservation and interpretation of the history and culture of the West End of Boston.

History 
In 1989 the editors of the West Ender Newsletter and members of the West End Historical
Association developed a preliminary plan for a West End Museum. In 1991 The Old West End Housing Corporation (OWEHC) was formed as a Community Development Corporation (CDC) with the mission of developing affordable housing for former West End residents who were displaced by the Urban Renewal of the 1950s when their houses were seized by eminent domain. After helping to develop affordable housing for former West Enders at West End Place at 150 Staniford Street, Boston, MA 02114, The OWEHC was awarded a commercial space, in 2002, for its offices along with the stipulation that it develop a West End Visitor Center. In 2003 The Bostonian Society donated and relocated the “Last Tenement” exhibit to 150 Staniford St. This was an exhibition displayed in the Old State House from October 1992 through April 1994, rendering the plight of the West End neighborhood. The exhibit laid the foundation for a permanent West End Museum. In 2010 Members of the OWEHC along with West End residents formed a committee with the goal to establish a permanent 501(c) 3 non-profit called The West End Museum, Inc.

Exhibition Space 
The museum consists of three exhibition areas and an archives. They also host regular programming.
The permanent exhibit "The Last Tenement", designed by the Bostonian Society in 1992 and relocated to the West End Museum in 2003, is housed in its own dedicated  space. The large exhibition space (1400 sq ft) mounts three revolving shows per year. Shows have included: "The Middlesex Canal: Boston's First Big Dig" and "Leaving the River.” The Members Gallery adjacent to the administrative offices mounts 6 revolving shows each year. Past shows in this space include: West End photographs from the archives of the Bostonian Society, "The Boston Canal", which was an extension of the Middlesex Canal through Causeway Street in the Bulfinch Triangle to Haymarket Square, and "Twenty Five Years of the West Ender Newsletter".

Notes

External links 
 

Museums in Boston
History museums in Massachusetts
West End, Boston